Haemoniae or Haimoniai was a town in ancient Arcadia, in the district Maenalia.

Its site is near the modern Perivolia/Rousvanaga.

References

Populated places in ancient Arcadia
Former populated places in Greece